is a subway station on the Tokyo Metro Marunouchi Line in Chiyoda, Tokyo, Japan, operated by the Tokyo subway operator Tokyo Metro.

Lines
The station is numbered "M-19".

Station layout
The station has two side platforms located on the basement ("B1F") level, serving two tracks. Platform 1 is accessed via entrances A1 to A3, while platform 2 is accessed via entrances A4 to A5. Passenger access between the two platforms is also provided via an underpass at the south end.

Platforms

History
Awajicho Station opened on 20 March 1956.

The station facilities were inherited by Tokyo Metro after the privatization of the Teito Rapid Transit Authority (TRTA) in 2004.

Passenger statistics
In fiscal 2014, the station was used by an average of 55,155 passengers daily.

Surrounding area

 Akihabara
 Holy Resurrection Cathedral
 Kanda River

Schools
 Meiji University
 Nihon University
 Chiyoda Elementary School

Other stations
 Ogawamachi Station ( Toei Shinjuku Line)
 Shin-Ochanomizu Station ( Tokyo Metro Chiyoda Line)
 Kanda Station
 Manseibashi Station (closed)

See also
 List of railway stations in Japan

References

External links

 Tokyo Metro station information 

Stations of Tokyo Metro
Tokyo Metro Marunouchi Line
Railway stations in Tokyo
Railway stations in Japan opened in 1956